The Cigarette Girl is a 1917 American silent drama film directed by William Parke and starring Gladys Hulette, Warner Oland and William Parke Jr.

Cast
 Gladys Hulette as The cigarette girl 
 Warner Oland as Mr. Wilson 
 William Parke Jr. as Money Meredith 
 Florence Hamilton as Mrs. Wilson 
 Billy Sullivan

References

Bibliography
 Jean-Marc Lehu. Branded Entertainment: Product Placement and Brand Strategy in the Entertainment Business. Kogan Page Publishers, 2007.

External links

1917 films
1917 drama films
Silent American drama films
Films directed by William Parke
American silent feature films
1910s English-language films
American black-and-white films
Pathé Exchange films
1910s American films